G-2 refers to the military intelligence staff in the United States Army at the Divisional Level and above. The position is generally headed by a Lieutenant General.  It is contrasted with G–1 (personnel), G–3 (operations), G–4 (logistics),  G-5 (planning), G-6 (network), G-7 (training), G-8 (finance), and G-9 (civil-military operations). These "G" sections have counterparts in other branches of the service, with the U.S. Navy using an  N– designation, the U.S. Air Force using the A- designation, and the Joint Staff using the J- designation. It is the higher level function of the S-2 (intelligence) with the "S" signifying intelligence directorates at the battalion or brigade level.

Deputy Chief of Staff for Intelligence (G-2)
The 47th and current Deputy Chief of Staff for Intelligence G-2, is Lieutenant General Laura A. Potter (USA). LTG Potter is "the senior advisor to the Secretary of the Army and Chief of Staff of the Army for all aspects of Intelligence, Counterintelligence and Security, and responsible for the training, equipping, policy and oversight of the Army Intelligence and Security Enterprise". See United States Army Intelligence and Security Command

History
G-2 intelligence played an important role during World War II, both aiding fighting forces and in special missions such as those of T-Force and Operation Alsos.
G-2 intelligence gathering and interpretation traces its history to the American Revolution. The Military Intelligence Service was formed during World War II.  In time, this evolved into the Military Intelligence Corps, one of the basic branches of the United States Army.

See also
Staff (military)
Military Intelligence Corps (United States Army)
Counter-intelligence
Counterintelligence Corps
MI5, the British intelligence agency tasked with domestic counter-intelligence and security 
MI6, the British intelligence agency tasked with foreign intelligence

References

Further reading
 Berkowitz, Bruce D., and Allan E. Goodman.  Strategic Intelligence for American National Security.  Princeton, NJ: Princeton University Press, 1989. 
 Finnegan, John Patrick, and Romana Danish.  Military Intelligence.  Washington, D.C.: Center of Military History, United States Army, 1998. 
 Miller, Nathan.  Spying for America: The Hidden History of U.S. Intelligence.  New York: Paragon House, 1989. 
 

Military intelligence
Department of the Army staff
Intelligence operations
Intelligence services of World War II
Intelligence of World War II
Defunct United States intelligence agencies